The Ysabel Valencia House is a historic adobe farmhouse and barn in Mimbres, New Mexico. It was built in 1930 for Ysabel Valencia. It was designed in the Vernacular New Mexico architectural style, with a hipped roof. It has been listed on the National Register of Historic Places since May 16, 1988.

References

Adobe buildings and structures in New Mexico
Houses on the National Register of Historic Places in New Mexico
National Register of Historic Places in Grant County, New Mexico